Harry Bowes (born 7 September 2001) is a professional rugby league footballer who plays as a  or  for Wakefield Trinity in the Betfred Super League.

Background
Bowes played his amateur rugby league for the Shaw Cross Sharks.

Playing career

2020
Bowes made his Super League debut for Wakefield Trinity against the Leeds Rhinos in round 11 of the 2020 Super League season.

References

External links
Wakefield Trinity profile
SL profile
Wakefield Academy profile

2001 births
Living people
English rugby league players
Rugby league hookers
Rugby league locks
Rugby league players from Yorkshire
Wakefield Trinity players